The Pirdop dialect is a Bulgarian dialect, which is part of the Balkan group of the Eastern Bulgarian dialects. Its range includes the towns of Pirdop, Zlatitsa and Koprivshtitsa, as well as several neighbouring villages. However, the Pirdop dialect also features a number of characteristics which bring it closer to the neighbouring Western Bulgarian dialects, and especially to the Botevgrad dialect and which, in turn, separate it from the rest of the Balkan dialects.

Phonological and morphological characteristics
 Vowel a for Old Church Slavonic ѫ (yus) and ъ in a stressed syllable and ъ in an unstressed syllable: маж vs. formal Bulgarian мъж (man), сан vs. formal Bulgarian сън (sleep), but мъ'жа vs. formal Bulgarian мъ'жът (the man)
 Verb ending -a instead of formal Bulgarian -ъ in a stressed syllable and a half-reduced -a in an unstressed syllable in verbs of the first and second conjugation: чет'а vs. formal Bulgarian чет'ъ (I read)
 ръ and лъ() for Old Church Slavonic groups ръ/рь and лъ/ль versus formal Bulgarian ръ/ър (/) and лъ/ъл (/): дръво, слъза instead of formal Bulgarian дърво, сълза (tree, tear).
 Ending e instead of formal Bulgarian i for multi-syllable masculine nouns (българе instead of българи)
 The masculine definite article is -a in a stressed syllable and a half-reduced -a in an unstressed syllable - кра'ка (the leg)

Most of the other phonological and morphological characteristics of the Pirdop dialect are similar to the general features typical for all Balkan dialects, cf. article.

Sources
Стойков, Стойко: Българска диалектология, Акад. изд. "Проф. Марин Дринов", 2006 

Dialects of the Bulgarian language